The Allegheny Wildlife Management Area is located on  on two separate tracts of mixed oak-hickory woodlands in western Mineral County along the Allegheny Front. The Barnum Road tract consists of old farm fields along the river and the ridgetop, connected by steep slopes.

Hunting and fishing
Hunting opportunities include bear, deer, grouse, squirrel and wild turkey. Trapping for fur can include bobcat, gray and red foxes and raccoon.  Fishing in the North Branch of the Potomac River can produce smallmouth bass, panfish and trout.

Camping is not permitted in the WMA.

Invasive species

The air-breathing northern snakehead fish have recently reported in the lower Potomac River.  Although no snakeheads have been detected in West Virginia, this invasive species from northern China had been declared a threat to the state's aquatic ecosystem.  Federal law prohibits transport of snakeheads across state lines.  Anyone who catches this fish when visiting the Allegheny WMA should carefully note the catch location, kill the fish by cutting or bleeding, and contact a WVDNR district biologist. The snakehead should not be released back into the Potomac River or any tributary.

See also
Animal conservation
Hunting
List of West Virginia wildlife management areas
Recreational fishing

References

External links
West Virginia Division of Natural Resources web site
West Virginia Hunting Regulations
West Virginia Fishing Regulations

Wildlife management areas of West Virginia
Protected areas of Mineral County, West Virginia
IUCN Category V